Komaki Kikuchi (born 22 February 1997) is a Japanese fencer. She won the gold medal in the women's team foil event at the 2018 Asian Games held in Jakarta, Indonesia.

In 2019, she won the gold medal in the women's team foil event at the Asian Fencing Championships held in Chiba, Japan. In the same year, she also competed in the women's foil event at the World Fencing Championships held in Budapest, Hungary. She was eliminated in her first match by Julia Walczyk of Poland.

References

External links 
 

Living people
1997 births
Place of birth missing (living people)
Japanese female foil fencers
Asian Games gold medalists for Japan
Asian Games medalists in fencing
Fencers at the 2018 Asian Games
Medalists at the 2018 Asian Games
Left-handed fencers
20th-century Japanese women
21st-century Japanese women